Lennart Folke Alfons Atterwall (born Ohlsson, 26 March 1911 – 23 April 2001) was a Swedish javelin thrower. He finished fourth at the 1936 Summer Olympics and won the European title in 1946. Atterwall held Swedish titles in the javelin throw (1934–35, 37–41 and 1946), pentathlon (1937) and decathlon (1940).

References

 1911 births
 2001 deaths
 Swedish male javelin throwers
 Olympic athletes of Sweden
 Athletes (track and field) at the 1936 Summer Olympics
 European Athletics Championships medalists